Ádám Hegedűs (born 29 March 1988 in Kecskemét) is a Hungarian football player who currently plays for Kecskeméti TE.

References 
Player Profile at Kecskemeti TE Official Website
HLSZ

1988 births
Living people
People from Kecskemét
Hungarian footballers
Association football forwards
Kecskeméti TE players
Mezőkövesdi SE footballers
Hungarian expatriate footballers
Expatriate footballers in Italy
Hungarian expatriate sportspeople in Italy
Sportspeople from Bács-Kiskun County